Thomas Peter Wilkens (born November 25, 1975) is an American former competition swimmer and Olympic medalist.

Wilkens represented the United States at the 2000 Summer Olympics in Sydney, Australia.  He received a bronze medal for his third-place performance in the men's 200-meter individual medley, finishing with a time of 2:00.87.  He also competed in the preliminary heats of the men's 200-meter breaststroke, but did not advance.  The breaststroker was one of the featured swimmers in P.H. Mullen's book Gold in the Water.

Wilkens grew up in Middletown Township, New Jersey, while swimming at the Middletown Swim and Tennis Club.  He attended Christian Brothers Academy in Lincroft, and graduated from Stanford University.  He was elected as a Republican to serve as a Township Committeeman in Middletown Township.

See also
 List of Olympic medalists in swimming (men)
 List of Stanford University people
 List of World Aquatics Championships medalists in swimming (men)

References

External links
 

1975 births
Living people
American male breaststroke swimmers
American male medley swimmers
Christian Brothers Academy (New Jersey) alumni
Medalists at the FINA World Swimming Championships (25 m)
New Jersey city council members
New Jersey Republicans
Olympic bronze medalists for the United States in swimming
People from Middletown Township, New Jersey
Stanford Cardinal men's swimmers
Swimmers at the 2000 Summer Olympics
World Aquatics Championships medalists in swimming
Medalists at the 2000 Summer Olympics
Universiade medalists in swimming
Goodwill Games medalists in swimming
Universiade gold medalists for the United States
Medalists at the 1995 Summer Universiade
Competitors at the 2001 Goodwill Games
20th-century American people